This is a list of captains and boat owners and others important in the history of the Murray-Darling steamer trade, predominantly between 1850 and 1950.

All entries relate to items on the list of Murray–Darling steamboats.

Notes

1. Spelling : Information in this article has mostly been gleaned from newspaper reports. Barbour, Bower, Christie, Davies, Dickson, Hampson, Hansen, Johnston, Lindqvist, Maultby, Miers, Pickhills, Reed, Rossiter, Schmedje, Searles, Tait, Theisz, Westergaard (all prominent people) often appeared in print as Barber, Bowers, Christie, Davis, Dixon, Hampton, Hanson, Johnson, Lindquist, Maltby, Myers, Pickels, Reid, Rossitter (or Rosseter), Smidgee (or Schmedge), Searle, Tate, Theiz (or Theitz) and Westergard. The firm of Johnson and Davies was spelled four different ways in their own advertisements. Boats were given the same treatment. The barge Tongo was often written "Tonga" and Goldsbrough often "Goldsborough". Although the owners should have known better, the vessel generally named Lady Augusta was actually registered as Lady Agusta and Leichardt was presumably (mis)named for the explorer Ludwig Leichhardt (1813 – c. 1848). The barge Rabbie Burns appears to have metamorphosed into Robbie Burns around 1880. The steamer here spelled "Ferret" may have been registered "Ferrett" – more information is needed. The town now (and here) spelled Narrandera was once mostly "Narandera", a spelling tenaciously retained by its newspaper.

2. Dates of service alongside names of boats and their owners and captains are from contemporary newspaper reports, which varied greatly in depth of information supplied. They would therefore not necessarily reflect the vessel or person's full period of service. Dates refer to service on the Murray system; some craft and most skippers had earlier or later service elsewhere.

3. In the interests of simplicity, honorifics (S.S., P.S., M.V. etc.) have been omitted from boat names.

4. Ownership of vessels was not often reported in the press, which accounts for this column being largely incomplete. The major companies (Wm. McCulloch & Co., Cramsie, Bowden & Co., E. Rich & Co., etc.) as well as owning vessels, also acted as agents for private owners, who may have been their captains, or absentee investors.

5. Almost without exception, no master or vessel was employed on the river throughout the year. In non-drought years shipping activity might be expected to run (give or take a month) from around June (with the winter rains) to December (with the snow melt).

Anderson

Charles Miller Anderson ( – 1 August 1942), came to Echuca from Stockholm in 1858 or 1859. He had been mate on the Morning Light and jumped ship at Melbourne to join the gold rush (Mudie p. 101). He married Margaret (c. 1831 – 28 February 1902) in 1863. They had two daughters and two sons and also raised nephew Hilary Hogg.
Charles "Swan" "Swannie" Anderson (c. 1871 – 1 August 1942), whose knowledge of the river was legendary, spent fifty years on the Murray, first as a deckhand on the Kelpie, then for Permewan Wright as master of the Goldsbrough, Rothbury and Alert; then the Success and Alfred, owned by T.H. Freeman. (There are no newspaper reports of these to supply dates). Lastly he skippered the River Murray Sawmills' Adelaide from 1912 to 1939, when he retired. He was married to Catherine, who predeceased him.
William John "Dollar" Anderson ( – 1 July 1949) worked on the Echuca wharf. His friend, bush poet Will Lawson, wrote a poem on his death.

Robert M. "Bob" Anderson (c. 1840 – 13 July 1889) of Mannum, possibly no relation, skippered Providence 1866–1867; Ariel 1868–1875; Nil Desperandum 1873; possibly Bogan 1868–1869 (Mudie p. 80). Married to Mary Elizabeth Anderson (c. 1841 – 20 November 1911).
A daughter married a son of Capt. Donald McBeath.
(Robert) Murray Anderson (c. 1869 – 15 December 1934) of Mannum and Mildura, with Sam Hoad purchased Wilcannia from William Tinks. He later owned Mildura sawmills.
He married Alice May Hooper (c. – 26 January 1915) in 1899, lived at "Edgecombe House", Mannum.
Max Anderson, son of Murray Anderson, owned the Mildura slip, and skippered Rothbury 1948 (Mudie p. 103)

Arnold

(Johann) George Arnold (c. 1863 – 25 May 1949) born in Gothenburg, Sweden, owner of Saddler 1894–, J. G. Arnold and Wilcannia 1911–, early worked on Golconda while Schuetze was her owner, may have become her owner and skipper to 1894; Saddler, Tyro and Renmark.(Mudie p. 133). He commissioned a number of vessels such as the huge barge Crowie (an aboriginal name for the brolga or "big 'un"). In 1913 the "Arnold Line" consisted of steamers Renmark, Wilcannia, Tyro, and Mundoo and barges Crowie, Gunbower, Loxton, Rosa and Duck. In 1898 he purchased the Perseverance but lost her while removing her through the Glenelg River mouth. For a time he owned Big Bend station and farmed for six years. He purchased W. R. Randell's shipbuilding yards at Mannum where during World War I he built over a dozen giant barges, which were employed in building the River Murray locks and many other boats, culminating in the Esmeralda. He grew wheat at Big Bend station then became one of the largest wheat traders on the river. He was partner with Mortimer Crane as M. C. Crane and Co. ( –1902).
He married Alvena Pauline Riedel ( – 2 March 1934) in 1892; they lived at "Esmeralda", Mannum.
Laurence Milo "Peter" Arnold (28 October 1910 – ) skippered Golconda; Avoca. He purchased Murrabit 1948 He was appointed director of Murray Shipping, Ltd. in 1948. He married Mavis Denton Oliver of Kensington Park around 1938.

Barclay

James "Jimmy" Barclay ( – 29 May 1914) was a member of the first Lady Augusta crew. He accompanied the wives of George and Thomas Johnston, James Ritchie and John Barclay when they sailed from Scotland on the Planter in 1857. then the Burra, which brought them to Adelaide on 28 January 1858. He captained Albury 1870, 1871, 1874, 1875; Maranoa 1870–1875; Wentworth 1872. A brother-in-law of G. B. Johnston, he was married to Grace (c. 1835 – 12 October 1910); they had a son John Barclay (c. 1871 – 3 October 1921) and lived in Goolwa.

John Barclay (c. 1826 – 1 November 1886) of Mundoora, perhaps an older brother, skippered Gundagai 1857–1864. Partnership with James King as Barclay & King was dissolved in 1864. He was married to Margaret (c. 1827 – 5 March 1912), sister of G. B. Johnston; they lived at Mundoora.
A son, James Barclay was partner with Thomas Wall as Wall & Barclay, storekeepers of Mundoora and Port Broughton in 1887.

Elizabeth Barclay (c. 1831 – 25 September 1920) married G. B. Johnston in 1852. She has been variously described as sister of John Barclay of Mundoora, sister in law of James Barclay and daughter of James Barclay of Cockenzie, Scotland. For all these statements to be true, Jimmy and John would have been brothers, sons of another James Barclay.

Bowring

William Bowring J.P. (c. 1852 – 28 July 1924) was mayor of Wentworth 1896–1898, 1901. He married Eliza Williams ( – 6 December 1909) of Gol Gol in 1878. His business, W. Bowring & Co., store owners of Wentworth, later also Mildura, ran trading steamers Emily Jane (destroyed by fire on Christmas Day, 1889) and Prince Alfred. He bought barge Marion from estate of George Fowler; sold her to Ben Chaffey.

Buzza

Thomas Buzza (c. 1833 – 25 April 1904) for some years owned sawmills at Back Creek (near Sandhurst), then Myers Flat (where payable gold was found in 1882), then the Wyuna Steam Sawmills near Koondrook and the Gannawarra Steam Sawmills. He built the Emily Jane (probably named for his wife) in 1875 (and skippered her 1877, 1880) and barge Goulburn in 1876. In 1882 he built White Swan and converted the Emily Jane to a log barge. but he continued to run a steamer Emily Jane, perhaps White Swan renamed, and was her skipper 1882 to 1887. In 1893 he sold up to run a business in Eaglehawk, but returned to Myers Flat in 1898.

Byrnes

James Manning Byrnes (c. 1838 – 9 October 1924) was overseer of a snagging gang for ten years, including 1879–1880 while the river was low. and later ran a butchery at Wilcannia, and was a town alderman and mayor for several terms; his sons owned several pastoral properties including Tintinallogy. He and his wife Mary had a property "Surbiton" on the Darling and moved to Knightsbridge, Adelaide around 1920.

Carlyon

William Symington "Billy" Carlyon (18 August 1859 – c. 5 September 1936) was an employee of Permewan Wright, initially as deckhand on the Kelpie then master of the Invincible 1886 (with Charles Hunt as deckhand), Barwon 1897, Elizabeth and finally the Wanera. He was one of the strikebreaking captains who together manned the Wm. Davies in May 1895.He kept the Criterion Hotel, Echuca, from 1897, and the Bridge Hotel, Moama 1913.
He married Mary Ellen Josephine Foley (c. 1872 – 5 October 1937) died at Brighton Road, St Kilda.

His sister Isabelle Halbert Carlyon ( – 25 January 1937) married Captain Gustav Lindqvist.

His sister Wilhelmina Carlyon (c. 1852 – 26 August 1915) married Captain John Innes.

His brother Thomas Symington Carlyon (1866 – 20 October 1925) was amateur champion oarsman of Victoria in 1896, kept the Criterion Hotel, Echuca, 1895–1897, then others in Ballarat, Creswick, Spencer Street, Melbourne, Hampton, Albert Park, Hotel Victoria, South Malbourne and finally the Esplanade Hotel, St Kilda. He is reported as having captained a River Murray steamer. He married Mary Ann (died 1920) Carlyon descendants were prominent in Melbourne business circles.

W. J. Carlyon was captain of Freetrader 1888 (though not aboard) when she sank irretrievably in 1914 and from around 1910 was licensee of the Bridge Hotel, Moama. This may be the same person identified as W. S. Carlyon above.

Cramsie, Bowden and Co.

Merchants and steamboat owners, with branches at Echuca, Hay, Balranald, and Wilcannia. They purchased their Wilcannia store in 1877.

John Cramsie (c. 1831 – 18 February 1910) ran businesses in Balranald: Sparkes and Cramsie (−1860) with Thomas Harrison Sparkes then Cramsie, Bowden and Co. from 1876. He was M.L.A. for Balranald in the N.S.W. parliament 1880–1887. A son, William A. Cramsie maintained a correspondence with Captain James Dickson.

John Clark Bowden (c. 1845 – 7 April 1924) was partner for a time, then with his son ran a hardware business specialising in aluminium goods. He was, as "J. B. Clark" leader of a successful racehorse syndicate and was an outspoken critic of the Victoria Racing Club.

Cremer

Edward Daniel Cremer (c. 1817 – c. 5 February 1892) of Goolwa "a most fearless seaman" skippered the cutters or schooners Unity 1866–1874 and Water Lily 1874–1876 but occasionally took on river steamers: Maranoa 1873; Enterprise 1877. He married Mary Driscoll (c. 1830 – 5 March 1900).
Son Daniel "Dan" Cremer (c. 1835 – May 1942) of Milang, skippered Cato 1896, 1897; then mail steamer Jupiter for around 30 years, and was skipper 1928 when she was hit by a severe storm. According to his newspaper obituary, he also skippered Florence Annie. He married Margaret Sarah Jury ( –1918) of Milang in 1905.

Curson

George Frederick Curson (c. 1822 – 1 April 1898) of Goolwa was partner in engineering firm Hooker & Curson, then manager, Goolwa Ironworks and Patent Slip. The steamer Cato was built for him and partner Joseph Nash (see below). George married Jane (c. 1827 – 5 February 1866), then Sarah (1827 – 22 January 1901), whose sister Eliza (c. 1840 – 2 August 1892) was married to Joseph Nash. His daughter Jane married Joseph, son of S. Shetliff, in 1874.

Davies

William J. "Commodore" "Bill" Davies (c. 1830 – 15 April 1903), born in Liverpool, skipper and part-owner (as Johnson, Davies and Co. then Davies and Locke, finally Wm. Davies and Son) of Pride of the Murray 1865–1877 and Nile 1885– . He also skippered Kelpie, Trafalgar 1877. He was partner with George Dorward in the firm of Dorward and Davies c. (1875–1884). He married (1) Annie (c. 1831 – 8 July 1875) in 1856, and (2) Teresa (Tassie) Helena Smith in 1878. Tussle over W. J. Davies' will 
Their son William E. Davies (15 September 1859 – 23 October 1902), aka William Davies jr., skippered Pride of the Murray 1878–1884; Nile 1887. He married Elizabeth Jane (c. 1864 – 5 March 1927) They had a son William H. Davies.

Dorward

George Johnston Dorward (c. 1831 – 9 March 1906) was born in Fifeshire and sailed to Melbourne as second mate on the Beemah in 1855. He accompanied Francis Cadell on his first voyage down the river from Albury, charting the river. He was on the Lady Darling when she first reached Echuca. He was on the Albury when it first reached the town of Albury. In the summer months he and Cadell were occupied in removing snags from the river. Lived at "Rosebank", Moama. He was a partner with William Davies in the firm Dorward & Davies (c. 1875–1884). He was later involved in wheat, sheep and cattle growing. He married Ann Haxton (c. 1832 – 24 August 1910) in Scotland before emigrating; they lived in Moama; he died in Toorak, leaving a considerable estate; his will was for a time contested by eldest son G. R. Dorward jun.
His eldest son, George Roy Dorward jun. (1853–) born at Echuca, skippered Kelpie 1877–1878; Pearl 1879–1880; Rodney 1878–1884; Alert 1901; Excelsior 1916.

Dowland

Thomas Dowland (c. 1833 – 27 March 1887) was a carpenter builder and undertaker who arrived in Australia in 1848 and resided in Goolwa from about 1860. He operated the steamer Express 1869–1870, which with her barge was sold to satisfy creditors after he was declared insolvent, and he returned to the building trade. He was married to Elizabeth (c. 1833 – 27 March 1887) and died at the Murray Bridge home of his daughter Milveena Woodard (1859–1935). He was mayor of Goolwa 1888. His son Frederick Archibald Dowland was mayor of Goolwa in 1898; left Goolwa for Fremantle mid-term, was later a warehouse manager in Singapore.

Egge

John Egge "The White Chinaman" (Mudie p. 99) was originally Chinese, being born in Shanghai, and was picked up in Canton by Francis Cadell to work on his ship Queen of Sheba. He assumed a Scandinavian surname (which should be pronounced as two syllables) and settled in Australia in 1852, farming on Hindmarsh Island, and became a successful trader and shipowner stationed at Wentworth. Despite his long residence and marriage to a British subject he was subjected in 1877 to a poll tax (under South Australia's Chinese Regulation Bill). Despite popular outrage (hundreds contributed to pay his fines) and support from both of Adelaide's newspapers, this was never reimbursed. Another celebrated victim of a similar law, but in New South Wales, was Way Lee. John's son Edwin David "Ned" or "Ted" Egge (1869 – 4 June 1946) held a river captain's certificate and was later a barber and businessman in Renmark. E. D. Egge married Alice Maud (c. May 1870 – 26 October 1942).

Foord

John Foord (c. 1820 – 15 February 1883) "The Emperor of Wahgunyah", owner of several flour mills, built the steamers Wahgunyah and Waradgery. He owned "Foord's Punt", which provided communication between Wahgunyah and Corowa on opposite sides of the Murray.

His son Fred Foord (c. 1840 – December 1878) skippered Wahgunyah 1866–1868; Waradgery 1868–1872; Lady Augusta 1870; then Jane Eliza 1872, but after several reverses, culminating in the Jane Eliza colliding with the Wahgunyah bridge, Fred ended up almost penniless and when he died was working as mate on the Victoria at Pooncarrie on the River Darling.

Francis

Albert "Bert" Francis (16 August 1874 – 21 September 1913) was born at Gumeracha and on leaving school settled at Mannum, where he became a boat engineer. He built the steamer Alpha in 1898 and traded on the Upper Murray between Morgan and Renmark. In 1902 he settled at Waikerie, where he bought land for fruit-growing. He later built the trading steamers Royal and Waikerie (the latter of which he was part-owner with Captain William Tinks). He was a successful real-estate developer, largely responsible for the township of Waikerie. In 1896 he married Amelia Clara Bertha Strempel (1874–1972) of Mannum.

Fuller

Benjamin Grove Fuller (1815 – 9 June 1902) was owner of Paringa and partner in the firm of Tonkin, Fuller & Martin. He married (1) Jane Assels (1810 – 11 December 1871) around 1844, with whom he had several children, including Benjamin Mark Fuller (1846–) and Charlotte (c. 1836 – 18 November 1874) who married Absalom Tonkin (see below) in 1855. (2) Elizabeth Ann Pearce (1850 – 3 April 1932) in 1874; they had six children. They lived at Swanport until around 1879, Milang until about 1885 then Morgan.

Benjamin Mark Fuller (1846 – 20 September 1912) captained Duke of Edinburgh 1868–1874, Vesta 1870, Moolgewanke 1874–1876, Waradgery 1878, Paringa 1883, Princess Royal 1891. He was captain and part owner (with Absalom Tonkin) of the Moolgewanke when her boiler burst, killing two men (for which he was held partly responsible), and a year later when her barge sank. He operated as a trader on the Murray with the Britannia and Paringa until 1891, when he opened a store, perhaps in Renmark or Morgan. Around 1895 he moved to Western Australia, where he worked for Millar's Jarrah and Timber Company. He married Mary Rowe Lean (1845 ) in 1865. Their daughter Laura married E. H. Golding of Gol Gol in 1892.

Grundy

George Grundy (c. 1818 – 4 July 1902), originally from Cockenzie, Scotland, Scotland was member of crew of Murray in 1866 which sailed to Australia with Capt. Berry for George B. Johnston. He was father of:
Robert "Bob" Grundy (c. 1846 – 19 May 1919) worked for Knox & Downs; skippered Tolarno and Menindie. He married Alice Dodd (c. 1863 – 11 August 1933) in 1883. He died on the Tolarno. Sons Alick (died 1946) and George worked for the Irrigation Department.
John Grundy (1858 – 20 March 1946) skippered Blanche, Bourke, Tarella and Renmark. He later worked for the Irrigation Trust and skippered Kelvin and Milang. He was married to Mary and lived at Murray Bridge.
George Grundy jun. (c. 1861 – 18 April 1940) (Mudie p. 156) of Goolwa skippered Brewarrina, Decoy, Murrumbidgee, Industry and Dispatch. He became, in 1922, South Australia's first lockmaster, at Blanchetown. He was married to Florence Ellen (c. 1864 – 3 July 1922).

Heseltine
Samuel Richard Heseltine (c. 1849 – 19 December 1920), a son of G. A. F. Heseltine of Gawler, captained Prince Alfred 1875 and the Menindie 1875, 1876, 1879 and Shannon 1880–1882, 1886 both of which he part owned. He was secretary of the Adelaide Racing Club from 1893, and died some months after being struck by a tramcar. He married Mary Jane Hillier (c. 1852 – 31 May 1933) around 1875.
A son, also named Samuel Richard Heseltine (6 April 1878 – ), was a solicitor and barrister, a practitioner in the Supreme Court and was in 1904 captain of the North Adelaide Football Club. In 1927 he succeeded H. W. Varley in his father's old position as secretary of the A.R.C.
Augustus Frederick "Gus" Heseltine (c. 1854 – 26 April 1879), fell from Menindie and was drowned near Overland Corner
John Charles Heseltine (1858 – 1 December 1935), captain of Shannon 1880–1885 (when she was destroyed by fire), then a wine and spirit merchant, never married, died after his car collided with a tram.

Hogg

Hilary Harding "Paddy" Hogg (18 July 1913 – ) born at St Kilda, was raised in Echuca by his aunt and uncle Capt. Charles Anderson. He had an engineering workshop in Echuca and was involved in petty crime in 1930, opened a timber mill 1938, then a radio and electrical shop. He gained dual qualifications as ship's engineer and riverboat captain; skippered Alexander Arbuthnot in 1942, then Hero, when he ran foul of the fisheries laws. He enlisted with the AIF as engineer with the 12th Small Ships Company, and was court-martialed on 25 June 1946. He sold up his electrical goods store early in 1948. Appointed master of Murrumbidgee 1947, he was captain of this vessel when his 6-week-old son Lawrence Hilary died 1948; the coroner could find no cause of death. A month later, on 29 November 1948, the Murrumbidgee burnt to the waterline while Hogg was skipper; his conduct during this emergency was praised. He was appointed first master of the Murrumbidgee II, soon after renamed Coonawarra. He was involved in the 1953 restoration of the paddle steamer Canberra. He was cited as co-respondent in the 1954 divorce of Neil Dryburgh Wallace and Pearl Royal Wallace (née Collins). He and his wife had four children: Beverley, Patricia, William and Mavis.

Hunt

Charles Frederick "Charley" Hunt (1852 – 3 April 1941), was owner of Invincible (which he bought from McCulloch, and rebuilt 1889) 1887–1917 and her (or their) skipper 1887–1892. He bought the Freetrader wreck, salvaged her machinery and copper sheathing and left the hulk where she lay, but was later called on to clear away her derelict hull, thus losing on the speculation. In 1918 he retired to St Kilda. He was married to Agnes Mary (died 20 October 1947).

Johnstone

Adam Johnstone was a member of Hew Cadell's Lady Emma crew from Cockenzie that brought the Gundagai and Albury in sections to Port Elliot and built them at Goolwa. Worked as mate on Menindie, Saddler and Shannon for S. Heseltine. Lived at "Woodlands", Murray Bridge, married Mary Ann Dalcam (c. May 1847 – 17 December 1932), and had five sons and seven daughters. Mary Ann married again, to John Thomas Medwell in 1911.

Mrs. A. L. Hawke (née Johnstone, born c. 1869, second daughter of Adam) identifies George Johnston (though spelled Johnstone) as Adam's cousin and Tom Johnstone [sic], owner of the Jolly Miller as his brother.

Thomas "Tom" Johnstone may or may not have been a significant figure on the Murray–Darling river trade; many references, on the balance of probabilities, properly refer to Thomas Johnston.

Kay

Robert Kay was a mate on the brig Halifax (owned by Francis Cadell's father Hew), and skippered the paddle steamer Lioness, rigged as a schooner, from Liverpool to Melbourne, arriving in 1853. His crew was George Johnston, Thomas Johnston, John Barclay, John McDonald, William Barber, John Ritchie, all from Cockenzie. The Lioness, though intended for the Murray, was sold in Melbourne without reaching the river.

He captained the brig Lady Emma directly from the Clyde to Port Elliot arriving in 1855 carrying the Gundagai and Albury in sections. His crew included Adam Johnstone, George Johnston, Thomas Johnston, John Barclay and John McDonald. James Barclay accompanied the wives of these last four when they emigrated in the Planter arriving January 1858.

A. T. Saunders appears to give the crew of Lady Emma as: Robert Kay (master); Robert Ross (mate); George Gibson (engineer); Avery (cook); George Johnston, James Ritchie, John Barclay, and William Barber (crew).

King

Hugh "Hughie" King (11 January 1840 – 7 October 1921) captained Ruby 1860; Lady Augusta 1861; Gundagai 1862–1865; Lady Darling 1864; Moira 1865–1869; Teviot 1868, 1870; Moira 1869; Jupiter 1869–1874; Princess Royal 1870–1873; J.H.P. 1872; Corowa 1897; Jane Eliza 1875, 1878; Gem 1890–1908.

He owned or part-owned the Teviot, Ellen, Moira 1865–, Princess Royal, Jupiter, Jane Eliza (with which he once towed three barges from Bourke), Gem (which he lengthened by 40 feet) J. H. P. 1872– and Ruby. The Gem Line, of which he was a principal, also ran the Corowa, Marion and the second Ruby. The partnership with George Chaffey as "H. King and Co." was taken over by Chaffey in 1897.

Rivalry between King with Gem and Cantwell with Trafalgar created considerable interest.

He married Isabel McKenzie (died 1888). They had four sons, two of whom outlived him. He married again, to Frances Judd on 26 August 1891 and retired to Morgan.
Third son Hugh William King, lived at Nor' West Bend. He captained Corowa; Gem 1889; Ruby; Ellen 1905; Murrumbidgee 1909 and others.
Youngest son Robert Alexander "Bob" King, lived at Morgan, married Jessie May Tapp in 1907.

Charles King skippered Elizabeth 1879
James King captained Gundagai 1864; Francis Cadell (which he owned) 1866; Jupiter and Ruby 1899 He was mentioned in "Letter to the Editor" 1870. In 1875, he sold up and fled to New Caledonia (Mudie, op. cit. p. 116). It is likely but not confirmed that these last two were sons of Hugh King.

Hugh King Drive, which runs alongside the River Murray at Mildura, may have been named for him, as was King's Row, a block of five houses in Morgan.

George King captained Pilot (which he owned) 1915–1917

M. King was proprietor of Globe Hotel, Crossenvale (1 km south of Echuca); he owned Riverina until 1887, when he sold her to David Bower.

Which King had Mannum 1901?

Knox and Downs

Knox and Downs Ltd. took over Federal Stores, Wilcannia, in 1912. The company lost 500 tons of supplies valued at between £3000 and £4000 in a fire on barges Nonpareil and Cobar that same year, which may have prompted them to purchase steamer Alfred and barge Uranus. They were implicated, by failure to maintain Alfred properly, in the death of crewman Charles James Thorn in 1917 They opened a store at Menindee in 1920.
Robert George Knox (1868 – 26 April 1948) was born in Belfast and came to Australia in 1886 arrived in Wilcannia in 1885 or 1886, where he worked for Keeble & Grainger. He opened his own office at White Cliffs, where he was involved in the development in the opal fields. He was a partner in Donaldson, Coburn & Knox (founded 1899 to take over Stone & Corney and the Wilcannia branch of E. Rich & Co.) then Knox & Downs in 1912. He was a director of Murray Shipping Ltd. He and his wife had a home in East Terrace, Kensington Gardens. Their daughter Maysie Warren Knox ( – 12 November 1947) married Railway Commissioner Robert Hall Chapman. Their son Robert George Knox jun. (23 August 1901 – ) was general manager of the firm.
Lewis Downs (c. 1860 – 8 February 1843) left England for Australia c. 1880 with one functioning lung and arrived at Wilcannia in 1885, working as accountant, became manager of Donaldson Coburn & Knox's Wilcannia branch in 1909, then in private practice though remaining a director of the firm. He married Alexandria McKenzie Campbell (c. 1865 – 3 March 1942); had homes at Tallala Terrace and Darby Street, Fullarton. They had two sons, Philip (Phillip?) "Phil" Downs, who left for Sydney c. 1910 and Alexander William "Alec" Downs (c. July 1895 – 27 August 1938), who died prematurely as a result of World War I injuries.

Kruse

Carl Heindrich Ferdinand Kruse (25 May 1823 – 27 June 1911) captained the schooner Ponkaree and later a three-masted schooner for T. R. Bowman, named "Ada and Clara" for Bowman's daughters, and used on Lake Albert. (It was later motorised and as a mail steamer operated between Milang, Narrung and Meningie. In 1939 it was renamed Showboat, based at Renmark.) He is reported as captain of Little Wonder 1880, but it is quite likely to be a typographical error for "Krause".
subject of NLA photo mislabeled F. H. C. Kruse
married Mary Rony (c. March 1830 – 21 May 1891)
son Heinrich Christian Ferdinand "Henry" Kruse ( – 28 March 1935) worked as deckhand on Despatch. He married Kate Mathilda Miller of Swanport in 1886.
daughter married H. Hoare
daughter E. V. Burgess
daughter J. Burgess

Laing

Thomas Laing ( – ) was the youngest son of James Laing sen. He was skipper of Rob Roy 1876 and Agnes 1879 (also engineer and part-owner of Agnes 1877–1880 and barge Rabbie Burns from before 1877). He was accused in 1878 of tampering with steam safety valves. Thomas Laing and Company was taken over by principals James Randell and David Luttet in 1880. He found employment with Robinson Bros., implement makers of Melbourne. He invented a harvester which performed well in trials around 1888. He married (Alvina) Janet Wark (c. 1857 – 31 October 1884) around 1878; the marriage was unstable; they separated 1884 and she died in Melbourne the same year. He married Harriett Burke in 1885; she died four years later.

Luth

Henry Luth (c. 1837 – c. 18 July 1883) was a sawmiller of Echuca; partner with Samuel Riddell as "Luth & Riddell" which took over the Phoenix Steam Sawmills in 1875, and soon dissolved amid recriminations; he continued as sole trader. He was owner of Moira 1875–

Luth was mayor of Echuca 1877–1878. He was married to Rose O'Neill Luth (c. 1840 – 16 June 1874). He married again, to Catherine "Kate" O'Hara (c. 1863 – 10 February 1889) in 1878. He drowned at Echuca after finalisation of his insolvency. He was insured for £1000, which was claimed by both his erstwhile creditors and the beneficiaries of his Will. The resulting court cases were complex and extensive. Luth Street, Echuca may be named for him.

McCoy

Alexander McCoy (c. 1822 – 29 September 1895), originally from Portsmouth, was captain of sailing ship Gem, then captained steamers Leichardt 1856–1858 and her sister ship Sturt 1856–1858. He sailed the Leichardt to Batavia 1859, for use as river transport for troops at Bangor Massam, Borneo during the Banjarmasin War. He brought the Settler through the Murray mouth 1861, then captained the Maid of the Yarra in the Spencer Gulf. He was instrumental in founding the Adelaide Steamship Company.

Alexander McCoy married Margaret (c. 1826 – 8 July 1861). He married again, to Annie Sanderson, whose brother was Francis J. Sanderson of HM Customs, in 1862; they had a home in Alberton, then Molesworth Street, North Adelaide. He may have been a brother-in law of Captain Davidson.

McCulloch and Co.

Founded by William McCulloch  (22 October 1832 – 4 April 1909), Wm.McCulloch and Co., Pty. Ltd. of Melbourne, ran the largest transport business on the Murray system between the years 1876 and 1886. Among the vessels they owned or operated were steamers Alert, Burrabogie, Corrong, Ethel Jackson, Freetrader, Invincible, Lady Daly, Little Wonder, Murrumbidgee, Pioneer, Princess, Saddler and Victoria; and barges Advance, Alice, Berder Chief, Canally, Darling, Federation, Gwydir, Horace, Jessie, Namoi, Pelican, Pimpampa, Sarah Jane, Shamrock, Swallow and Willandra. They began divesting their Murray properties around 1885 to small operators such as John Egge and Charley Hunt. The business was taken over by Cramsie, Bowden and Co., which was in turn taken over by Permewan, Wright and Co.

Matulick

Alexander Ferdinand "Fred" Matulick (July 1856 – 24 June 1937) was a boat builder and owner born in Port Elliot the son of a shipwright, worked in Goolwa, building steamers Napier 1874, Shannon 1877, Victor 1877 and Shamrock 1884 and barge Laurel; arrived in Renmark in 1887, where he built the wooden bridge across the creek at Renmark Ave. (completed around 1892) and as partner in Matulick and Oliver ran a stone quarry, then Morgan, where he built Pyap 1897 and Ruby 1908(?).  He and brother Francis Joseph "Frank" Matulick (c. 1859 – 30 August 1939)  built homes and offices: "Olivewood" for Charles Chaffey and residence for Colonel Morant. His firm A. F. Matulick and Co. became Matulick & Jones around 1910. He married Ann Harper of Meadows around 1878.

Maultby

Joseph Touchstone Maultby (c. 1833 – 10 March 1915) was born in Ireland and came to Echuca from Canada, where he had worked on river steamers. In 1868 he opened a store in North Wagga Wagga, and began trading up and down the river in the steamer Enterprise in 1871, opening a store at Narrandera around the same time. He commissioned, owned and skippered Hero 1874–1890; then sold up to run a store in Yarrawonga. He died in a Melbourne private hospital; his wife Elizabeth died later the same day.

Frederick William Maultby (c. 1856 – 26 September 1932) captained Pearl in 1883. Possibly unrelated, though both originally from Ireland. He was a son of Henry Warner Maultby of Cork, and married Emma Warren Collings (c. 1862 – 30 November 1945) in 1885.

Mennie

Henry Horn Mennie was a deep-water sailor from Devonshire who was captain of the schooner Josephine L'Oizeau (owned by the River Murray Navigation Company!), when she was wrecked at Port Elliot on 10 July 1856, but with no loss of life; Mennie and the harbour master Nation were highly praised for their conduct and Mennie was absolved of any blame. (The River Murray Navigation Company's new iron barge Goulburn, being towed by steamer Melbourne from Port Adelaide, was lost off Cape Jervis in the same storm with the loss of several lives.) He then captained the Murray steamer Gundagai for the 1856 season. He returned to the sea, in charge of the schooner James Gibson which was wrecked on an uncharted reef off the island of Rodriguez on 20 January 1858 on his way from Adelaide to Mauritius; again he was praised for his efforts and exonerated. He was granted the publican's licence for the Sportsman's Arms, Rockhampton in 1864.

Mumby
George Humble Mumby married Eliza Mann on 12 October 1876. It is possible he was master of Alfred at some stage but evidence is lacking. His son (George) Michael Mumby (13 September 1880 – 22 February 1944) was master of Rob Roy 1913, and the Alfred May 1917 when she sank, killing crewman Charles James Thorn. He and mate Job Eastwood were charged with manslaughter but acquitted. A widower, he enlisted September 1917, served during World War I in the Tunnelling Corps of the Australian Army. He married again, to Frances Hooton (née Hooper) in 1919 and took up a farm at Curlwaa. He enlisted with the Citizens' Military Forces and served as a Private during World War II, during which service he accidentally drowned.

Murray and Jackson

Proponents of stern-wheelers, these two Americans built the Settler 1861, Lady Daly 1862 and Lady Darling 1864 from selected Oregon pine. and ran an extensive shipping agency operating on the Murray, the east coast of Australia and to New Zealand. They later also owned Corowa, Culgoa and Francis Cadell. A. L. Blake was a close associate. Their partnership was dissolved in 1869.

Alexander Sinclair Murray (26 November 1827 – 26 November 1914) was born in Scotland and before coming to Australia was owner of the paddle steamer Washington, which plied on the Sacramento River, California. He skippered Settler 1861, 1862, and later ran excursion trips on the Hawkesbury River in his steamboat General Gordon.

Peleg Whitford Jackson (c. 1834 – 24 April 1912), born in Addison, Vermont, after coming to Australia was involved in the firms Victorian Coach Company, and the South Australian branch of Cobb & Co before his partnership with A. S. Murray. He skippered Settler 1862, 1863 and Lady Daly 1865. He was declared bankrupt 1870. He was at one time married to a Margaret Greig. He married Anna Chambers (9 December 1845 – 2 October 1907), daughter of pastoralist James Chambers in 1869. They lived variously in Albury, Charleville, Beechworth and Brighton and had six children.

Murray Shipping Ltd.

A South Australian company with registered office in Steamship Buildings, Adelaide, and headquarters at Morgan, formed in June 1919 by combining the river interests (only) of Permewan Wright, and Gem Navigation Co., J. G. Arnold's fleet from Mannum, Knox and Downs from Wilcannia and A. H. Landseer. The fleet included the Invincible, Ulonga, Marion, Gem, Ada, Vega, Colonel, Oscar W., Pevensey and Australien, all of which were based in Echuca. F. O. Wallin joined the consortium in 1932. The company ceased trading in 1952 and was wound up in 1954.

Payne

Frederick Payne (c. 1833 – 22 February 1911) came to Australia from England, lived in Echuca from around 1856 and from around 1859 worked as an auctioneer and commission agent. He was active there until 1882 (including a stint as mayor in 1866). He owned Resolute  −1879, Invincible 1877–1879; Express 1878; Riverina, Undaunted, Lady of the Lake 1880– ; and Maude and the barge Confidence. He skippered Lady of the Lake 1884, 1887, 1896–1898. He married twice: to Marianne (or Mariane) Louise Boxall (c. 1839 – 8 October 1873) on 17 June 1862; then to Alice Boxall ( – ) on 24 December 1874. Two sons were involved in Murray trade:
Charles William Frederick "Charlie" Payne (c. 1875 – ) born in Echuca, captained Elfie 1896; Pioneer for 11 years including the seasons 1897, 1898, 1903; Ellen c. 1910; Marion 1911, 1921–1931; Princess Royal 1911, 1912; Ruby 1925, 1931; Tarella?Tolarno? 1926; Renmark; Wilcannia; Tyro for J. G. Arnold's "Arnold Line"; Gem 1936; Merle 1946, 1947. He lived in Renmark. and is noted for his series of historic Murray photographs: #1 # No. 3 No. 4 No. 5 No. 6 No. 7 No. 8 No. 9 No. 10 No. 11
Harry Payne (in adverts as "W. Payne") ( – ) of Mannum skippered Lady of the Lake 1896; Maude 1896–1898; Brewarrina 1904; Marion 1912;Tyro 1912; Renmark 1914; Ruby 1924; Pevensey in 1937, 1939; Gem 1939; Renmark 1940. He acted as Drage's mate on Marion 1938. He may have been the Capt. Payne on Cato 1908.

Randell

William Beavis Randell, flour miller of Gumeracha married Mary Ann Elliott Beare (1799–1874) on 17 April 1823. Among their children were:
William Richard Randell (2 May 1824 – 4 March 1911) with the Mary Ann (1853–1855) was the first to prove a steamer could operate commercially on the Murray. He owned Ariel; owned and skippered Gemini 1855–1859; Bunyip 1858, 1859, 1861–1863; Bogan 1864–1869; Nil Desperandum 1870–1874; Corowa 1876. With E. B. Scott (see below), as Randell & Scott, he had stores at Wentworth, Booligal and Hay (sold 1861 to Morgan & Pollard). He married Elizabeth Ann "Annie" Nickels (1835 – 16?17? October 1924) on 24 December 1853. Among their children were:
William Beavis Randell (1 June 1856 – 19 September 1917), known as "Captain Randell", married Hannah Finlayson (1854–1928) in 1880. He was a famous motor-cyclist who held a world record in 1914.
(Richard) Murray Randell (2 February 1863 – 6 March 1952) Also known as "Captain Randell", he managed the fleet of paddle steamers on the Murray for 56 years  and captained most if not all of them, including Tyro (which he owned) 1904, 1909. Lived on houseboat Murrundie (previously P.S. Menindie) at Murray Bridge from 1912. He married Anne Florence "Florrie" McKirdy of Mannum on 3 July 1889.
James Percy "Jim" Randell (22 April 1867 – 4 January 1914) with D. Luttet owned Agnes 1880–1887; captained Waradgery 1907. He married (Violet Sarah) Rose Bock.
Albert Wentworth Randell (18 September 1870 – 3 October 1923) worked for Renmark Irrigation Trust, captained Federal; he owned steamer Tyro.
Thomas George Randell (c. 1826 – 14 May 1880) married Mary Smith (c. 1828 – 16 April 1870). Assisted brother William in his pioneering river voyages. He later managed a slipway at Mannum and a store on the Bogan river.(Mudie p. 200)
Eldest daughter Mary Evelyn Randell (c. 1852 – 29 October 1927) married Captain Charles Claus "Charlie" Bock (c. 1843 – 4 December 1919) on 10 February 1875.
Ernest Walter Randell (1866–1940) buried at Mannum
Elliott Charles Randell (1832 – 29 April 1908) skippered Bunyip (which he owned) 1859, 1860; Gemini (which he owned); Pearl 1866–1872, 1875, 1876; Corowa (which he owned) 1873–1876, 1880; Gem 1877–1879; Princess Royal 1879; Ruby 1880; Success 1881, 1882. Lived at Hay, Echuca and Moama. He was declared insolvent in 1878 and forced to sell his farm.
Alfred Elliot Randell (c. 1856 – 21 January 1892) skippered Ruby 1880–1881; Corowa 1885–1886 (stuck in Darling during drought), Waradgery 1890–1892. He was declared insolvent 1881. He married Katherine W. Swaine on 25 January 1890. Their daughter was born three weeks after he died.
Ebenezer Hartly "Eb" Randell (March 1838 – 6 September 1890) skippered Gemini 1860; Bunyip 1861; Moolgewanke 1863–1865, 1867, 1868, 1870, 1871, 1874; Pearl 1870, 1875;  Corowa 1871, Ariel 1880–1882; Roma 1884–1886 (when it was destroyed by fire). He owned and skippered Riverina 1871–1873; Corowa 1871–. He married Ada Caroline Farmer on 25 December 1867.

Ernest W. "Ern" Randell, perhaps an American, (Mudie p. 217) skippered Endeavour, Undaunted, Wanera 1953
His son Ernest R. Randell skipper of Excelsior 1923, 1925.

Rich

Edward Rich (c. 1844 – c. 15 September 1912) was founder and managing director of E. Rich & Co, shipping agents of Brewarrina (founded 1872), then Bourke (c. 1887) and Wilcannia. They sold their fleet consisting of steamers Brewarrina, Cato, Excelsior, Lancashire Lass, Maude, Mundoo, Pilot and Rob Roy and the barges Albemarle, Alice, Border Chief, Emily, Rabbie Burns, Swan, Trader, and Victory to Permewan, Wright & Co. of Victoria in 1907.

Earlier vessels they owned or represented include steamers Elfie, Florence Annie, Lady of the Lake, Moira, Pioneer, Rothbury, and Victoria and barges Bantam, Cobar, Cutty Sark, Duck, Ferrett (sic in 1896 advt.), Golconda, Howlong, McIntyre, Paragon, Shamrock and Walgett. The company later became Hales Ltd.

Ritchie

James Ritchie (1832 – 23 April 1881) of Goolwa was a member of first Lady Augusta crew. He owned Pioneer with J. H. Brown, then on his own. He skippered Jolly Miller 1868.  He married Alison Johnstone (12 August 1829 – 20 February 1913). Three, perhaps four sons were captains of river boats:
James "Jim" Ritchie ( – ) skippered Lady Augusta 1867; Providence 1868; Victoria 1871–1873; Burrabogie 1875–1877; Cadell 1923, 1925. He married Wenfried Hennessy of Goolwa in 1866. Her sister Eliza married William Barber.
John David Ritchie ( – 19 May 1942) was mayor of Goolwa 1925. Skippered Jupiter 1892–1894, 1896–1897; possibly Cadell 1923, 1925. He married Elisabeth Miriam ( – 20 December 1931)
George Ritchie (14 December 1864 – 7 August 1944) mayor and M.P., owner of Alexandra, Bantam and Venus; captained Pioneer 1878–1882, 1891–1894; Alexandra 1904, 1906. He married Charlotte Annie Knapman in 1899; later lived at "Port Seaton", Flinders St., Kent Town.
David Johnstone Ritchie (c. 1874 – ) was mayor of Goolwa 1922, purchased Cadell 1923, and brought her back to the Murray. He married Violet Mayfield in 1903; lived at Semaphore.
Margaret Annie Ritchie married Tom Goode (1846–1921) of Goolwa on 27 November 1901.

Westergaard

(Frederick) William Westergaard (c. 1840 – 20 November 1923) was shipwright at Echuca with G. B. Air to 1884, then with David W. Milne. He left in 1886 and with his son James managed the dry dock at Mannum, then in 1902 moved to Fremantle. He was married to Ann.
James Peter Westergaard (1870–1957) married Agnes Wilhelmina Busch (1872–1957)

Peter Andreas Ammentorp Westergaard (28 December 1854 – 17 January 1919), born in Odense, skippered Kingfisher 1882, Barwon 1887–1893, Goldsbrough 1884–1886, Nile 1891, Wm. Davies 1895–1902. He was later Echuca manager of Permewan, Wright and Co. He married Janet Reid (1857–1939) lived at Echuca.
Helen married Ralph Bentinck Beere McCulloch (1887–1967).
Lewen Westergaard of Echuca was engineer for Permewan, Wright & Co.

Sources
Mudie, Ian Riverboats, Sun Books, Melbourne 1965

References

Australian riverboat captains
Murray-Darling related lists
South Australia-related lists